Elizabeth Boyer may refer to:
 Elizabeth Boyer (actress) (1902–1946), played in  The Sport of the Gods (1921) and featured on 2008 US postage stamp
 Elizabeth H. Boyer (born 1952), American fantasy author
 Elizabeth M. Boyer (1913–2002), American lawyer, feminist founder of Women's Equity Action League (WEAL), and writer